Lichtblick ("Ray of Hope") is a CD + DVD release by German electronic artist Christopher Von Deylen under his principal project Schiller. The album was released on 26 November 2010, and contains 9 compositions from Schiller.

Lichtblick features collaborations with other international artists such as Kate Havnevik, Mia Bergström, Anggun and Despina Vandi.

Tracking listing

Super Deluxe Edition

The super deluxe edition of the album will be offered as a box set containing three discs (2 DVD + 1 CD).

Lichtblick EP - CD 
 Lichtblick (UK: Ray of Hope)
 Ghost (with Kate Havnevik)
 Zeitschleife (UK: Time Warp)
 Daylight (with Mia Bergström)
 Heimathafen (UK: Home Port)
 Innocent Lies (with Anggun)
 Le Vide
 Sunday (with Despina Vandi)
 Lichtblick Reprise

DVD 01 - Atemlos Live

Atemlos Live
 Playing With Madness (Instrumental)
 Soho
 Tiefblau (UK: Deep Blue)
 Blind (with Anggun)
 Innocent Lies (with Anggun)
 Ruhe (UK: Peace)
 La Mer
 Under My Skin (with Kim Sanders)
 Let Me Love You (with Kim Sanders)
 Polarstern
 Schiller
 Don't Go (with Kate Havnevik)
 The Fire (with Kate Havnevik)
 Salton Sea
 Delicately Yours (with Kim Sanders)
 Irrlicht (UK: Misguiding Light)
 Himmelblau (UK: Blue Sky)
 Das Glockenspiel (UK: The Bell)
 Always You (with Anggun)
 Reprise Part 1
 Reprise Part 2
 Ein Schoener Tag (UK: A Beautiful Day)
 Sehnsucht (UK: Desire)
 Let It Rise (with Midge Ure)
 Playing With Madness (with Mia Bergström)
 Sommernacht (UK: Summer Night)

Audiokommentar
 Christopher von Deylen ueber die entstehung von atemlos live

Surround test
 Audio-referenz zum einpegeln des surround-sounds

DVD 02 - Heimathafen

Heimathafen
 Schiller
 Soho
 Polarstern
 Atemlos
 Leidenschaft (UK: Passion)
 Heimathafen
 Tiefblau
 Irrlicht
 La Mer
 Himmelblau

Ten more
 kurzfilm von philip glaser

Zeitschleife
 Bilderreise durch schiller's lichterwelt

Wall of friends
 Become a part of lichtblick

Ultra Deluxe Edition

CD
 Lichtblick
 Ghost (with Kate Havnevik)
 Zeitschleife
 Daylight (with Mia Bergström)
 Heimathafen
 Innocent Lies (with Anggun)
 Le Vide
 Sunday (with Despina Vandi)
 Lichtblick Reprise

DVD 01

Atemlos Live
 Playing With Madness (Instrumental)
 Soho
 Tiefblau
 Blind (with Anggun)
 Innocent Lies (with Anggun)
 Ruhe
 La Mer
 Under My Skin (with Kim Sanders)
 Let Me Love You (with Kim Sanders)
 Polarstern
 Schiller
 Don't Go (with Kate Havnevik)
 The Fire (with Kate Havnevik)
 Salton Sea
 Delicately Yours (with Kim Sanders)
 Irrlicht
 Himmelblau
 Das Glockenspiel
 Always You (with Anggun)
 Reprise Part 1
 Reprise Part 2
 Ein Schoener Tag
 Sehnsucht
 Let It Rise (with Midge Ure)
 Playing With Madness (with Mia Bergström)
 Sommernacht

Audiokommentar
 Christopher von Deylen ueber die entstehung von atemlos live

Surround test
 Audio-referenz zum einpegeln des surround-sounds

DVD 02

Heimathafen
 Schiller
 Soho
 Polarstern
 Atemlos
 Leidenschaft
 Heimathafen
 Tiefblau
 Irrlicht
 La Mer
 Himmelblau

Ten more
 kurzfilm von philip glaser

Zeitschleife
 Bilderreise durch schiller's lichterwelt

Wall of friends
 Become a part of lichtblick

EXTRA 2CD: ATEMLOS LIVE

CD 01
 Laying With Madness (Instrumental)
 Soho
 Tiefblau
 Blind (with Anggun)
 Innocent Lies (with Anggun)
 Ruhe
 La Mer
 Under My Skin (with Kim Sanders)
 Let Me Love You (with Kim Sanders)
 Polarstern
 Schiller
 Don't Go (with Kate Havnevik)
 The Fire (with Kate Havnevik)

CD 02
 Salton Sea
 Delicately Yours (with Kim Sanders)
 Irrlicht
 Himmelblau
 Das Glockenspiel
 Always You (with Anggun)
 Reprise Part 1
 Reprise Part 2
 Ein Schoener Tag
 Sehnsucht
 Let It Rise (with Midge Ure)
 Playing With Madness (with Mia Bergström)
 Sommernacht

References

External links 
 Lichtblick microsite
 Official international homepage  

2010 compilation albums
Compilation albums by German artists
Schiller (band) albums

ru:Atemlos